Gudauta Bay is a bay in the Black Sea near Gudauta, Abkhazia.

References

Bays of Abkhazia
Bays of the Black Sea